The National Players is the longest-running classical touring company in the United States.

Classical Touring Company 
After 70 consecutive seasons of touring, this acting company has given approximately 6,600 performances and workshops on plays by Shakespeare, O'Neill, Molière, Shaw, Kafka, Sophocles, Aeschylus, Aristophanes, Stoppard and Peter Shaffer.  Currently a program of Olney Theatre Center, National Players has performed for the public in 41 states, reaching young audiences in areas that are isolated geographically or economically – audiences that would otherwise never see live performances of classic plays.  In response to invitations from the Department of Defense and the State Department, Players have toured Europe, Asia, and the Middle East performing for American military.  During the Korean War, they made a six-week tour of Japan and Korea to entertain GIs, and have been to 5 White House receptions in appreciation for outstanding service.

History 
National Players was founded in 1949 by Father Gilbert V. Hartke, OP, a prominent arts educator and head of the drama department at Catholic University of America. His mission—to stimulate young people’s higher thinking skills and imaginations by presenting classical plays in surprisingly accessible ways—is as urgent and vital today as it was sixty-four years ago. A single twin-bill truck-and-station-wagon company, traveling under the banner of "Players, Incorporated," "University Players, " "Players," and finally "National Players," has continued to bring classic productions across the country from September to May.

How Players Works 
A nationwide search of graduates of college and university theater programs leads to the casting of members of the touring company. In the tradition of traveling players, the troupe arrives a few hours before the scheduled performance to prepare the stage: raise the set, hang and focus the lights, check sound equipment and props, and arrange dressing rooms, before donning costumes and make-up.  When the final curtain falls, they do everything in reverse.

The Current Tour 
National Players is now in its 70th year of touring. This year's productions are Shakespeare's Twelfth Night, a stage adaptation of Jules Verne's Around the World in 80 Days, and Arthur Miller's The Crucible.

Tour 69: Shakespeare's Othello, a stage adaptation of Lewis Carroll's Alice in Wonderland, and an adaptation of F. Scott Fitzgerald's The Great Gatsby.

Tour 68: Shakespeare's Hamlet, a stage adaptation of John Steinbeck's The Grapes of Wrath, and an adaptation by Eric Coble of Lois Lowry's The Giver.

Tour 67: Shakespeare's A Midsummer Night's Dream and Julius Caesar;
Benjamin Kingsland's adaptation of Charles Dickens' novel A Tale of Two Cities

Tour 66: Shakespeare's As You Like It and The Tempest;
Christopher Sergel's adaptation of Harper Lee's novel To Kill a Mockingbird

Tour 65:Shakespeare's Macbeth and Comedy of Errors;
an adaptation of Homer's Odyssey

Credits 
The National Players have received accolades from Walter Kerr, drama critic emeritus of The New York Times; Patrick Hayes, founder and managing director of the Washington Performing Arts Society; and the late Helen Hayes. Players' alumni include John Heard, Laurence Luckinbill, Gino Conforti, John Slattery, Daniel Hugh Kelly, Stan Wojewodski (former Dean of the Yale School of Drama) and David Richards (drama critic for the New York Times). Most recently, National Players received special recognition from The Shakespeare Guild, presenter of The Golden Quill, the Sir John Gielgud Award for Excellence in the Dramatic Arts.

External links
National Players Website

Theatre companies in Maryland
Catholic University of America
Performing groups established in 1949
1949 establishments in the United States